Professor Chacha Nyaigotti-Chacha (born 22nd August 1952 in Kuria District, Nyanza Province, Kenya) is a Kenyan playwright and consummate educationalist. He has served as an executive secretary of the Inter-University Council for East Africa (2000–2010), and was the first CEO of the Kenyan Higher Education Loans Board (1995–2000). He is currently serving as the Chairman of the Kenyan Commission for University Education (CUE).

He was educated at Kenyatta College, receiving a BEd (Honours) (Swahili Language), and later studied at Yale University, gaining an MA in Anthropological Linguistics and a Ph.D. in Swahili Language Linguistics. He has been a Tutorial Fellow and Lecturer in Swahili Language and Linguistics at Kenyatta University and later Egerton University in Kenya. He was a Research Professor at the Institute of Regional Integration and Development of the Catholic University of East Africa.

Merits
2004	Awarded the Order of the Grand Warrior (OGW) Medal (Kenya).

1994	Awarded Head of State Commendation (HSC) Medal (Kenya) for 
	Distinguished Service.

Bibliography
Ushairi wa Abdilatif Abdalla: Sautiya Utetezi, Nyaigotti-Chacha, C., Dar es Salaam University Press (DUP), 1992. (Protest Theme in Swahili Poetry).
Traditional Medicine in Africa, Edited by Sindiga, Isaac, Nyaigotti-Chacha, C. and Kanunah, M. P., East African Educational Publishers, 1995. 
Mke Mwenza, Nyaigotti-Chacha, C., East Africa Education Publishers, 1997, (A Swahili storybook)
Wingu Jeusi, Nyaigotti-Chacha, C., 1987, 
Hukumu, Nyaigotti-Chacha, C., Longman Kenya, 1992,  / 
Marejeo, Kenya Lit. Bureau, 1986

Other works
The position of Kiswahili in Kenya, Nyaigotti-Chacha, C., University of Nairobi, Institute of African Studies, 1981
African Universities in the Twenty-first Century, Edited by Paul Tiyambe Zeleza Adebayo Olukoshi, Chapter 5: Public Universities, Private Funding: The Challenges in East Africa, Nyaigotti-Chacha, C., 2005
REFORMING HIGHER EDUCATION IN KENYA CHALLENGES, LESSONS AND OPPORTUNITIES, Nyaigotti-Chacha, C., Kenya August 2004

External links
Academics streaming out of Africa
Learning difficulties in Africa

Living people
Kenyan writers
1952 births